Elkind is a surname. Notable people with the surname include:

David Elkind (born 1931), American psychologist and author
Edith Elkind, Estonian computer scientist
Jerome I. Elkind, American electrical engineer and computer scientist

See also
Elkins (surname)